Domnall mac Cellaig (died 728) was a King of Connacht from the Uí Briúin branch of the Connachta. He was the son of
Cellach mac Rogallaig (died 705), a previous king. The sept of Ui Briun he belonged to was the Síl Cellaig of Loch Cime.

Domnall has been omitted from the king-lists but his reign is attested in the annals. He succeeded Indrechtach mac Muiredaig Muillethan (died 723) as king and ruled 723–728. His son Flaithrí mac Domnaill (died 779) was also a king of Connacht.

Notes

See also
Kings of Connacht

References

 Annals of Tigernach
 Francis J.Byrne, Irish Kings and High-Kings
 Book of Leinster,Section 30
 Laud Synchronisms
 The Chronology of the Irish Annals, Daniel P. McCarthy

External links
CELT: Corpus of Electronic Texts at University College Cork

728 deaths
Kings of Connacht
People from County Galway
8th-century Irish monarchs
People from County Roscommon
Year of birth unknown